Ladian or Ladhian is a village in Phillaur tehsil of Jalandhar District of Punjab State, India. The village is administrated by a Sarpanch, an elected representative of the village.

Demographics 
As of 2011, the village has a population size of 575. The village has schedule caste (SC) constitutes 61.04% of total population of the village and it doesn't have any Schedule Tribe (ST) population.

Education 
The village has a co-ed primary school which was founded in 1955. It provides a mid-day meal as per the Indian Midday Meal Scheme.

Transport

Rail 

Air 

References 

Villages in Jalandhar district
Villages in Phillaur tehsil